Russian Chants «Parastas» is an album by Russian composer Boris Feoktistov and American composer Bill Laswell. It was released in 1995 by Meldac. The album comprises ambient soundscapes created by Laswell structured around Russian orthodox liturgical chants authored by Boris Feoktistov.

Track listing

Personnel 
Adapted from the Russian Chants «Parastas» liner notes.
Musicians
Bill Laswell – bass guitar, drum programming, effects, mixing
Technical personnel
Hisao Hirata – producer
Akira Kitajima – cover art
Layng Martine – assistant engineer
Robert Musso – engineering, guitar
Masayo Takise – mastering

Release history

References

External links 
 Russian Chants «Parastas» at Bandcamp
 

1995 remix albums
Bill Laswell remix albums
Boris Feoktistov albums